The Cincinnati–Xavier rivalry is a college sports rivalry between the University of Cincinnati Bearcats and the Xavier University Musketeers. The rivalry dates to their first college football game between the teams in 1918. The first men's college basketball game was played in 1927, which has become the most famous sport in the rivalry, known as the Crosstown Shootout. National outlets cover the game each year, many considering that it is one of the fiercest rivalries in college basketball. The college football series would run until the Xavier Musketeers football ceased play after their final season in 1973. Many other sports at the universities, such as baseball, also face off annually.

History

As the two universities located in Cincinnati, the history between the University of Cincinnati and Xavier University runs deep. Cincinnati itself is the smallest city to be home to two power conference basketball teams. Combined with a metro population of around 2.1 million and the schools being a mere 3 miles apart, the rivalry runs deep for many in the Greater Cincinnati region. The original contest in the Crosstown Shootout was a much awaited match up between the schools, as Cincinnati helped Xavier dedicate the newly opened Schmidt Fieldhouse in 1928. Over time, the series began to develop an imbalance as Cincinnati became a national powerhouse in basketball and enrollments began to quickly grow compared to Xavier in the 1950s and 60's. However, the "little brother" would knock off UC from time to time in both football and basketball much to the disappointment of the Bearcat faithful. After Xavier shuttered its football program in 1973, the main attention of the rivalry turned to basketball. By the 1990s both teams had become bonafide programs with Xavier knocking off two No. 1 Bearcats teams in series history. Although Cincinnati fans will point to the all-time series dominance, Xavier fans will be quick to retort that the Musketeers have won 12 of the last 18 contests as of 2020.

Football

Cincinnati and Xavier would first play in 1918, but the series would not become an annual event until 1946. The game would be played each year at Cincinnati's Nippert Stadium as the venue had a larger capacity to accommodate the cross city showdown compared to Xavier's Corcoran Stadium.

Joseph A. Meyer holds the distinction of coaching both schools in football, but only in the rivalry game once. He would lead to Bearcats to victory over the Musketeers in 1942.

In the 1960s and 1970s Xavier's team experienced a downturn with the Xavier board of trustees finally voting to eliminate the football program, which had caused financial strain on the university after the 1973 season. At the time of the decision, UC Coach Tony Mason lamented the loss of the series. He compared it to other city rivalries in college football such as the UCLA–USC rivalry and stated, "There's no way to replace that kind of rivalry."

Notable games
October 25, 1947:In a tight game in front of a sold out crowd, the Bearcats managed to scoot by the Musketeers thanks to the fantastic play of halfback Roger Stephens. The Bearcats would win 27–25 and go onto capture the MAC title.

November 17, 1951: The biggest matchup of the series, over 30,000 fans packed into Nippert Stadium to watch the 9–0 Bearcats take on the 7–0–1 Musketeers. UC would stall three times inside the Musketeer's 20 yard line. After a 98 yard pick six, Xavier would crack the game wide open against Sid Gillman's Bearcats and the Musketeers would be victorious 26–0.

October 13, 1956: In UC's Homecoming game, Xavier would end up triumphant winning 34–14. Xavier's excited fans would uproot and take UC's goalposts from the field in the post-game excitement. Xavier's student council would later offer $500 to Cincinnati to cover costs.

September 28, 1968: Xavier entered into the contest as favorites, but the Bearcats were led by the one-two punch of QB Greg Cook and WR/K Jim O'Brien. The Musketeers fought valiantly and the Bearcats only managed to win on a fourth quarter field goal from O'Brien.

Game results

Source

Men's Basketball

Women's Basketball

Both sides face off to secure the Kendle Cup. Cincinnati leads the all time series 27–16. Cincinnati has started the latest streak, having won the 3 most recent contests.

Game results

Source

Wins by venue

Baseball

Cincinnati leads the all-time series with the Musketeers, 99–58 as of the end of the 2021 season.

Each year since 2008, the teams play in the Joe Nuxhall Classic. This is a regional tournament that takes place between Cincinnati, Xavier, Wright State, and Miami (OH).

A recent wrinkle added to the college baseball rivalry between the teams, is current Bearcats manager Scott Googins. Googins who was the previous manager of Xavier from 2006–2017, and his arrival to Clifton brought additional attention to the contest.

On May 18, 2019 the teams played their final season game at Great American Ball Park immediately following the Cincinnati Reds game that same day.

References

College football rivalries in the United States
Cincinnati Bearcats football
Xavier Musketeers football